Shur Ab Sar (also Romanized as Shūr Āb Sar; also known as Shūr Āb) is a village in Mehravan Rural District, in the Central District of Neka County, Mazandaran Province, Iran. At the 2006 census, its population was 216, in 59 families.

References 

Populated places in Neka County